St Andrew's Secondary School is an 11–18 mixed, Roman Catholic comprehensive secondary school in Glasgow, Scotland. Its catchment area includes much of the East End of the city, including such districts as Baillieston, Craigend, Cranhill, Easterhouse, Greenfield, Shettleston, Tollcross and Wellhouse.

References

External links
 

Catholic secondary schools in Glasgow